Nyle Salmans is a former American football coach. He was the 23rd head football coach at Ottawa University in Ottawa, Kansas, serving for five seasons, from 1979 to 1983, and compiling a record of 24–26–11.

Prior to taking the job at Ottawa, Salmans was an assistant coach at Fort Scott Community College in Fort Scott, Kansas.

Head coaching record

References

1940s births
Living people
Fort Scott Greyhounds football coaches
Ottawa Braves football coaches